Rebecca Podio is an American beauty pageant titleholder from Newcastle, Wyoming.

Biography
Podio was crowned Miss Wyoming 2013 on Saturday, June 22, 2013, in Sheridan, Wyoming.  She competed in the Miss America pageant in September 2013.

A native of Newcastle, WY, she is a graduate of University of Wyoming, where she majored in petroleum engineering, finance and economics. She is a cousin of Dana Perino, co-host of The Five, on Fox News.

References

External links
Miss Wyoming official website
Miss America official website

Living people
People from Newcastle, Wyoming
Beauty pageant contestants from Wyoming
Miss America 2014 delegates
American beauty pageant winners
University of Wyoming alumni
Year of birth missing (living people)